Boust is a commune in the Moselle department in Grand Est in northeastern France.

The localities of Basse Parthe (German: Niederparth), Haute Parthe (German: Oberparth) and Usselskirch (German: Usselskirch) are incorporated in the commune.

Population

See also
 Communes of the Moselle department

References

External links
 

Communes of Moselle (department)